(), also known as , is a traditional fermented milk product from Sweden, and a common dairy product within the Nordic countries. It is made by fermenting cow's milk with a variety of bacteria from the species Lactococcus lactis and Leuconostoc mesenteroides. The bacteria metabolize lactose, the sugar naturally found in milk, into lactic acid, which means people who are lactose intolerant can tolerate it better than other dairy products. The acid gives  a sour taste and causes proteins in the milk, mainly casein, to coagulate, thus thickening the final product. The bacteria also produce a limited amount of diacetyl, a compound with a buttery flavor, which gives  its characteristic taste.

 has a mild and slightly acidic taste. It has a shelf-life of around 10–14 days at refrigeration temperature.

Overview 
In the Nordic countries,  is often eaten with breakfast cereal, muesli or crushed crisp bread on top. Some people add sugar, jam, apple sauce, cinnamon, ginger, fruits, or berries for extra flavor. The drink is also popular in Latvian kitchens, where it is called ,  ('fermented milk' or 'sour milk') and can be bought ready from stores but is more commonly made at home. Due to its popularity, it can be bought in many stores alongside kefir.

Manufactured  is made from pasteurised, homogenised, and standardised cow's milk. Although homemade  has been around for a long time (written records from the 18th century speak of -like products, but it has probably been around since the Viking Age or longer), it was first introduced to the Swedish market as a consumer product in 1931 by the Swedish dairy cooperative Arla. The first  was unflavoured and contained 3% milkfat. Since the 1960s, different varieties of unflavoured  have been marketed in Swedish grocery stores. In 1997, Arla introduced its first flavoured : strawberry-flavoured . The flavoured  was so popular that different flavours soon followed. By 2001, almost one third of the  sold in Sweden was flavoured .

In English
Furthermore, articles written in English can be found that use the Swedish term , as well as the Anglicised spellings filmjolk,  mjölk, and  mjolk.

In baking, when  is called for, cultured buttermilk can be substituted.

In Finland Swedish
In Finland Swedish, the dialects spoken by the Swedish-speaking population of Finland,  is the equivalent of filbunke in Sweden.

Types in Sweden
In Sweden, there are five Swedish dairy cooperatives that produce : Arla Foods, Falköpings Mejeri, Gefleortens Mejeri, Norrmejerier, and Skånemejerier.

 culture is a variety of bacterium from the species Lactococcus lactis and Leuconostoc mesenteroides, e.g., Arla's  culture contains Lactococcus lactis subsp. lactis, Lactococcus lactis subsp. cremoris, Lactococcus lactis biovar. diacetylactis, and Leuconostoc mesenteroides subsp. cremoris.

Classic variants

Probiotic variants

Homemade filmjölk
The  culture is needed when using pasteurised milk because the bacteria occurring naturally in milk are killed during the pasteurisation process.

Tätmjölk
Lukewarm milk is added to the container and left to ferment for one to two days. More  can then be made by adding completed  to milk.

Sundew and butterwort are carnivorous plants that have enzymes that degrade proteins, which make the milk thick.

See also 
 Cuisine of Sweden
 Amasi
 Kumis
 Skyr
 Yogurt
 Ayran
 Viili
 Matzoon
 Buttermilk
 List of dairy products

Notes

References 
 

Fermented dairy products
Danish cuisine
Norwegian cuisine
Swedish drinks